Culex (Lophoceraomyia) mammilifer is a species of mosquito belonging to the genus Culex. It is found in Cambodia, China, India, the Andaman Islands, Indonesia, Malaysia, Philippines, Sri Lanka, and Thailand.

References

External links 
Occurrence of Culex (Lophoceraomyia) quadripalpis, Culex (Lophoceraomyia) mammilifer, and Uranotaenia (Pseudoficalbia) novobscura in Assam, India.
Six New Species of the Culex (Lophoceraomyia) Mammilifer Group from Thailand (Diptera: Culicidae)

mammilifer
Insects described in 1908